The Pirin Folk Ensemble (Folkloren ansambal „Pirin“) (also Pirin Folk Song and Dances State Ensemble) is a Bulgarian performance group. It consists of a folk orchestra, a dance troupe, and a women's choir. The ensemble strives to preserve Bulgarian culture by performing traditional music and dance from throughout Bulgaria. It has performed over 6500 concerts in 50 different countries, and produced numerous LPs, CDs, videos, and songbooks. National Geographic called Pirin "an organic synthesis of the regional folk choral and dance traditions of Bulgaria."

The Pirin Folk Ensemble, named after the Pirin Mountains, was founded in 1954 in Blagoevgrad, a town in southwestern Bulgaria. Professor Kiril Stefanov was the Pirin Folk Ensemble's chief art director and conductor for many years.

Productions

CDs
Magical Voices of Bulgaria, 1994
The Voice of Pirin, 1995
Ray Lema Professeur Stefanov et les Voix Bulgares de l'Ensemble Pirin, 1997
Pirin Folk, 1998
Bulgarian Voices, 1999
Folk Bouquet: Pirin Pearls, 2000
Zapei, Zemya, 2002
Variegated Folk Kaleidescope, 2003

Videos"My Pirin": Folk Bouquet of melodies, songs and rhythmsAll That Youth'', 1996

See also
Bulgarian dances
Music of Bulgaria
Pirin Mountains
List of folk dance performance groups

References

External links
 
Pirin music

Bulgarian folk music groups
Bulgarian choirs
Folk dance companies
Musical groups established in 1954
Blagoevgrad